Heather Lake is a lake in Gallatin County, Montana in the Gallatin Range in south central Montana.

References

Lakes of Montana